
Gmina Ostroróg is an urban-rural gmina (administrative district) in Szamotuły County, Greater Poland Voivodeship, in west-central Poland.

Villages
Apart from the town of Ostroróg, Gmina Ostroróg contains the villages and settlements of Bielejewo, Binino, Binińskie Huby, Bobulczyn, Dobrojewo, Forestowo, Karolewo, Klemensowo, Kluczewo, Kluczewo-Huby, Oporowo, Piaskowo, Rudki, Rudki-Huby, Szczepankowo, Wielonek and Zapust.

Neighbouring gminas
Gmina Ostroróg is bordered by the gminas of Obrzycko, Pniewy, Szamotuły and Wronki.

References
Polish official population figures 2006

Ostrorog
Szamotuły County